A hesperidium (plural hesperidia) is a modified berry with a tough, leathery rind.

Etymology
Carl Linnaeus gave the name Hesperideæ to an order containing the genus Citrus, in allusion to the golden apples of the Hesperides.

Development
The outer ovary wall becomes the thick spongy layer of the rind, while the inner ovary wall becomes very juicy with several seeds. The peel contains volatile oil glands in pits. The fleshy interior is composed of separate sections, called carpels, filled with fluid-filled vesicles that are specialized hair cells.

Uses
Oranges, lemons, limes, and grapefruit are all common examples of hesperidia. Unlike most other berries, the rind of cultivated hesperidia is generally not eaten with the fruit because it is tough and bitter. A common exception is the kumquat, which is consumed entirely.

The outermost, pigmented layer of rind contains essential oils and is known as the flavedo.  When scraped off and used as a culinary ingredient it is called zest. A confection called succade can also be produced by candying the inner rind (known as pith or albedo) of the citron or lemon.

See also

 Fruit anatomy

References

External links

Fruit morphology
Rutaceae